Berberis pallida is a shrub in the Berberidaceae described as a species in 1840. It is endemic to Mexico, known from the States of Guanajuato, Hidalgo, Oaxaca, Veracruz, Puebla, Querétaro, and Tamaulipas.

References

Flora of Mexico
pallida
Plants described in 1840